Human rights in Kenya internationally maintain a variety of mixed opinions; specifically, political freedoms are highlighted as being poor and homosexuality remains a crime. In the Freedom in the World index for 2017, Kenya held a rating of '4' for civil liberties and political freedoms, in which a scale of "1" (most free) to "7" (least free) is practised.

History

Kenyatta (1964 – 1978)

During the first post-independence presidency of Kenya, under President Jomo Kenyatta, state security forces harassed dissidents and were suspected of complicity in several murders of prominent personalities deemed as threats to his regime, including Pio Gama Pinto, Tom Mboya and J.M. Kariuki. MP and Lawyer C.M.G. Argwings-Kodhek and former Kadu Leader and minister Ronald Ngala also died, in suspicious car accidents.

Moi (1978–2002)
The Daniel arap Moi administration consistently received international criticism of its record on human rights. Under Moi, security forces regularly subjected opposition leaders and pro-democracy activists to arbitrary arrest, detention without trial, abuse in custody, and deadly force.

International aid donors and governments such as the United States, Germany, the United Kingdom, and Norway periodically broke off diplomatic relations and suspended aid allocations, pending human rights improvement.

Kibaki (since 2002)
Since 2002, under the Mwai Kibaki presidency, politically motivated human rights violations have diminished, but other serious human rights abuses persist, a great many at the hands of security forces, particularly the police. The police force is widely viewed as the most corrupt entity in the country, given to extorting bribes, complicity in criminal activity, and using excessive force against both criminal suspects and crowds. Most police who commit abuses still do so with impunity. Prison conditions remain life-threatening.

Apart from police and penal system abuses, infringements of rights in the course of legal proceedings are widespread, despite recent pressure on judicial personnel. Freedom of speech and of the press continue to be compromised through various forms of harassment of journalists and activists. Violence and discrimination against women are rife. The abuse of children, including in forced labor and prostitution, is a serious problem. Female genital mutilation (FGM) remains widespread, despite 2001 legislation against it for girls under 16. The abuse of women and girls, including early marriage and wife inheritance, is a factor in the spread of human immunodeficiency virus/acquired immune deficiency syndrome (HIV/AIDS).

Kenya made some progress in 2003, when it set up a national human rights institution, the Kenya National Commission on Human Rights (KNCHR), with a mandate to ensure Kenya's compliance with international human rights standards. Also, parliament passed the Children's Act to ensure the protection of minors, as well as the Disability Act, outlawing discrimination against the disabled.

In November 2005 the Kenyan government banned rallies of opposition parties, rejecting calls for new elections. Vice President Moody Awori stated:
The government considers these calls for nationwide rallies inappropriate and a threat to national security ...
Accordingly, the government will not allow the planned rallies and wananchi (citizens) are cautioned not to attend the meetings.

On 3 June 2007, two days after President Mwai Kibaki stated that Mungiki members "should expect no mercy", about 300 Mungiki members were arrested and at least 20 killed. John Michuki, at the time Minister for Internal Security, publicly stated following the killings, "We will pulverize and finish them off. Even those arrested over the recent killings, I cannot tell you where they are today. What you will certainly hear is that so and so's burial is tomorrow". In the KNCHR's Cry of Blood – Report on Extra-Judicial Killings and Disappearances published in September 2008, the KNCHR reported these in their key finding "e)", stating that the forced disappearances and extrajudicial killings appeared to be official policy.

In November 2008, WikiLeaks brought wide international attention to The Cry of Blood. In the report, the KNCHR's first key finding "a)" was that "the evidence gathered by the KNCHR establishes patterns of conduct by the Kenya Police that may constitute crimes against humanity.

On 5 March 2009, two of the human rights investigators involved in the investigations documented in the report, Oscar Kamau Kingara and John Paul Oulu, were assassinated. Their assassinations were attributed by non-governmental organisations to the security forces.

In 2009 and 2010, Samburu people suffered severe human rights violations.

Historical situation
The following chart shows Kenya's ratings since 1972 in the Freedom in the World reports, published annually by Freedom House. A rating of 1 is "free"; 7, "not free".

International treaties
Kenya's stances on international human rights treaties are as follows:

Press freedom

Under British rule 
The seeds of the press, and media in general, were planted by English missionaries colonizing Kenya. The basic function of the publications, such as The Taveta Chronicle, Leader, and Uganda Mail was to disseminate British news and create a sense of legitimacy for the English missionaries. These practices continued with the introduction of the radio in 1928. However, press rights for native Kenyans were severely limited. Any opportunities for native Kenyans to access the press were used to make pleas for their freedom from colonial rule.

After independence 
Individual press freedoms for the citizens of Kenya were still rather limited after they gained Independence. The new Kenyan government took control of most forms of the media in order to spread their vision of Kenyan ideals. However, at this time privately owned newspapers, such as the Standard emerged, although these private entities were still subject to governmental control and censorship.

2010 Constitution 
The newest Constitution of the Kenyan government for the first time fully enumerated some individual rights to expression and information. However, there is a lack of unilateral freedom of expression for Kenyan citizens. Amongst the most notable omissions from the enumerated rights is the right to express propaganda for war or an incitement of violence. Moreover, the Kenyan government still retains some control over the spread of dissenting ideas during wartime. 
In the realm of media specifically, the Constitution prohibits the government from interfering with the spread of truthful information or with any individual's right to access to that information. The government nonetheless sets standards for media content and regulates the enforcement of those rules.

Present-day press rights 
The Kenyan government, however, did not intend to staunchly adhere to these new mandates of the constitution. As recently as 2013, Kenyan policymakers amended previous laws to limit certain media coverage of terrorist attacks and attempted to suppress the reporting of the deteriorating safety in Kenya. The amendment to the Kenya Information and Communication Act works to stifle efforts of publications that put forth critical perspectives of the Kenyan government. Although there have been some governmental efforts to enhance the press freedoms of Kenyan citizens, such as The Media Council Bill of 2013 which created a governmental body that would promote and protect the freedom of the media, the enforcement of the act did more harm than good in promoting press freedoms. According to an independent study conducted by Freedom House, Kenya's press rights are considered to be somewhat comprehensive. The press is only considered "partly free" largely because of the governmental efforts to enact laws that grant more control over media and publications. Moreover, previous laws, such as the Preservation of Public Security Act, which give the government the right to declare any information to be a security threat and censor that information, are still in effect and have yet to be repealed or amended.

See also

Kenya Human Rights Commission
Kenya National Commission on Human Rights
Centre for Minority Rights Development (Cemiride), an NGO advocacy group that works on behalf of minority and indigenous communities in Kenya and East Africa. 
Internet censorship and surveillance in Kenya
LGBT rights in Kenya
Prizm Project, a human rights education program for young women in Kenya and South Africa.

Notes 
1.Note that the "Year" signifies the "Year covered". Therefore the information for the year marked 2008 is from the report published in 2009, and so on.
2.As of 1 January.
3.The 1982 report covers the year 1981 and the first half of 1982, and the following 1984 report covers the second half of 1982 and the whole of 1983. In the interest of simplicity, these two aberrant "year and a half" reports have been split into three-year-long reports through interpolation.

References

External links
2004 Human Rights Report on Kenya – US Department of State
Freedom of expression in Kenya – IFEX
Transparency International – Kenya
 2012 Annual Report, by Amnesty International
 Freedom in the World 2011 Report, by Freedom House
 World Report 2012, by Human Rights Watch

 
Kenya
Law of Kenya
Politics of Kenya